The Anyanya (also Anya-Nya) were a southern Sudanese separatist rebel army formed during the First Sudanese Civil War (1955–1972). A separate movement that rose during the Second Sudanese Civil War were, in turn, called Anyanya II. Anyanya means "snake venom" in the Madi language.

History 
Anyanya was founded in 1963, as the Moru, Nuer, Lotuko, Madi, Bari, Acholi, Zande, Dinka, and other people from the entire southern region of Sudan waged a war against the Sudanese government. This mobilization came to be known as the Anyanya rebellion or the First Sudanese Civil War. It ended when the Anyanya signed the Addis Ababa Agreement with the Government in 1972.

The Anyanya movement, although relatively strong, was weakened by the internal political wrangling amongst the leading politicians of the liberation movement. In 1969, Aggrey Jaden left the Anyanya movement due to his frustration with the lack of cohesiveness and bickering within the movement. Shortly after Gordon Muortat Mayen was elected unanimously as Southern Sudan's new president of the movement, the former SSPG was renamed the Nile Provisional Government (NPG). Under Muortat, the movement was able to carry on waging war against the North. However, Muortat's chief of staff Joseph Lagu was able through his assistant Oliver Batali Albino to negotiate with Israel, to divert the arms they were supplying the movement with, to himself, instead of the president Gordon Muortat. Following this, Lagu openly formed a coup against Muortat, and made every battalion pledge allegiance to him instead of Muortat if they wanted arms. The coup was able to successfully unite the army under Lagu and the transition of power was peaceful, Lagu assumed leadership of the movement both politically and militarily, and carried on the warfare against the north, the movement was renamed the South Sudan Liberation Movement. In 1972, Joseph Lagu signed a peace agreement with the north, ending the 17 year civil war. The peace agreement was initially rejected by leading members of the military such as Emmanuel Abuur and John Garang. However a letter circulated to all Anyanya forces which detailed the plan of the rebellion against the peace agreement was intercepted.

Legacy 
Even before the civil war's formal end, many Anyanya had crossed the border to Uganda, where their ally Idi Amin controlled the military. Despite opposition by the Ugandan President Milton Obote, Amin had recruited these fighters into the Uganda Army. After Amin had overthrown Obote and assumed the Ugandan presidency in 1971, he recruited even more ex-Anyanya into the Uganda Army, as he regarded them as loyal to his government. Most of the Sudanese ex-insurgents actually acted as mercenaries. Ali Towelli and Godwin Sule were notable former Anyanya in the Ugandan military. As result of their association with Amin's unpopular regime, "Anyanya" eventually became a derogatory term in Uganda and was used as negative catch-all word for northern Ugandans as well as foreigners.

In 1975, many discontented former Anyanya who had stayed in Sudan, took up arms in eastern Upper Nile and Equatoria. They were labeled Anyanya II. When the Addis Abeba Agreement fell apart in 1983, marking the beginning of the Second Sudanese Civil War, the Sudan People's Liberation Movement/Army (SPLM/A) was founded. Competition between Anyanya II and the SPLM/A led to the eventual defeat of Anyanya II. Some of its members were incorporated into the ranks of the SPLM/A, and others were consolidated into a militia supported by the government of Sudan.

Notes

References

Works cited 

 
 
 

Rebel groups in Sudan
Rebel groups in South Sudan
History of Sudan
History of South Sudan
Wars involving Sudan
Rebellions in Africa
Politics of South Sudan
First Sudanese Civil War